Anton Viktorovich Chermashentsev (born 21 June 1976 in Novosibirsk) is a former Olympic rower who competed for Russia in the two Olympic Games. He won bronze medal in the coxed eight competition 1996 Summer Olympics. He was also a participant of 2000 summer Olympics. He received the award of order for services to the fatherland 4th degree.

References 
 
 
 

1976 births
Living people
Russian male rowers
Rowers at the 1996 Summer Olympics
Rowers at the 2000 Summer Olympics
Olympic rowers of Russia
Olympic bronze medalists for Russia
Olympic medalists in rowing
Medalists at the 1996 Summer Olympics
Sportspeople from Novosibirsk